The 2016 Hungaroring GP3 Series round was a GP3 Series motor race held on 23 and 24 July 2016 at the Hungaroring in Mogyoród, Pest, Hungary. It was the fourth round of the 2016 GP3 Series. The race weekend supported the 2016 Hungarian Grand Prix.

Background
Richard Gonda returned to the GP3 grid after missing the third round at Silverstone.

Classification

Qualifying
Nyck de Vries secured his first pole position of the season with a time of 1:32.979 - nearly half a second faster than that of second-placed driver, Matt Parry. Antonio Fuoco achieved third place, only marginally less than half a second off the pace of de Vries.

Race 1
Matt Parry took his first GP3 win and Koiranen GP's second for the year. Fuoco achieved second and Jake Dennis in third.

Race 2
Alexander Albon took his third win of the season, extending his lead in the championship over teammate, Leclerc. Arjun Maini achieved second place in his fourth outing with the Jenzer Motorsport team, whilst Leclerc came through in third place.

Standings after the round

Drivers' Championship standings

Teams' Championship standings

 Note: Only the top five positions are included for both sets of standings.

See also 
 2016 Hungarian Grand Prix
 2016 Hungaroring GP2 Series round

References

External links 
 Official website of GP3 Series

|- style="text-align:center"
|width="35%"|Previous race:
|width="30%"|GP3 Series2016 season
|width="40%"|Next race:

GP3
Hungaroring
Hungaroring